TRNSMT is a large annual music festival that takes place in Glasgow Green in Glasgow, Scotland. The festival first took place in 2017. The following page is a list of acts that have performed at TRNSMT.

2017

Main Stage

King Tuts Stage

Jack Rocks Stage

2018

Main Stage

King Tuts Stage

2019

Main Stage

King Tut's Stage

Queen Tut's Stage

2020 

The 2020 festival was cancelled due to COVID-19, however the planned line up was as follows:

Main Stage

King Tut's Stage

River Stage 

TRNSMT announced their cancellation on 24 April 2020, a day after the First Minister of Scotland Nicola Sturgeon said public events were likely to be banned "for some time to come".

2021 

The 2021 festival was rescheduled to September instead of the usual slot July due to going COVID-19, many of the same lineup remained the same, however several acts (including Sunday night headliner Lewis Capaldi) pulled out:

Main Stage

King Tut's Stage

River Stage

The Boogie Bar

2022

Main Stage

King Tut's Stage

River Stage

The Boogie Bar

References 

Music festivals in Scotland
Events in Glasgow